A bonus room, flex room, multiuse room or spare room (though the latter often means an extra bedroom) is a room created by remodeling or adding an addition that does not meet local building code definitions for traditional rooms, or is designed for multiple possible uses. For example, codes will typically require that a bedroom have a window and a certain number of electrical outlets. Such a room might actually be intended for sleeping, but will be described as a "bonus room" in rental and sales listings.

Etymology
The term bonus room is mainly used in the United States.  One early use is from The New York Times in 1991, which wrote that "A recent solution to the problem of noisy teen-agers is the enticingly titled bonus room, which is a spare room on the bedroom floor that can be used as a den, television room or guest room."

References

Rooms